Dark Angel may refer to:

Film
The Dark Angel (1925 film), a silent film starring Ronald Colman and Vilma Banky
The Dark Angel (1935 film), a film starring Fredric March and Merle Oberon
Dark Angel (1990 film), or I Come in Peace, a science fiction thriller featuring Dolph Lundgren
Dark Angel: The Ascent, a 1994 film starring Angela Featherstone
Dark Angel (1996 film), a TV detective film starring Eric Roberts
Bettie Page: Dark Angel, a 2004 biographical film

Literature
Dark Angel (Andrews novel), a 1986 novel in the Casteel series by V.C. Andrews
Dark Angel (Dale novel), a 1995 novel by John Dale
The Dark Angel (Waltari novel), a 1952 novel by Mika Waltari
The Darkangel Trilogy, a series of fantasy novels by Meredith Ann Pierce
Dark Angel (DC Comics), a character in Wonder Woman comics
Dark Angel (Marvel Comics) or Shevaun Haldane, a fictional superheroine from the Marvel Comics imprint Marvel UK
Warren Worthington III or Dark Angel, a character in Marvel Comics' X-Men
Dark Angel, a manga by Kia Asamiya
Dark Angel, a novel by David Klass
The Dark Angel, a novel by Elly Griffiths
"The Dark Angel", a poem by Lionel Johnson
Dark Angel or Kathisul Evin, a character and herald of Galactus in Marvel UK's Cyberspace 3000

Music
Dark Angel (band), an American thrash metal band
Dark Angel (Lee Hyori album)
"Dark Angel", a song by Blue Rodeo from Five Days in July
"Darkangel", a song by VNV Nation from Empires
"Dark Angel", a song by Benny Joy
"Dark Angel", a 1996 song by Electronic from Raise the Pressure
”Dark Angel”, a 2018 song by Provoker

Television
Dark Angel (American TV series), an American science fiction series starring Jessica Alba
Dark Angel (British TV series), a British true crime television mini-series
"Dark Angel", a 1972 episode of Kung Fu
The Dark Angel, a 1987 UK serial based on Uncle Silas by J. Sheridan Le Fanu

Videos games
Dark Angel (video game), a 2002 video game based on the 2000 TV series
Dark Angel: Vampire Apocalypse, a 2001 hack-and-slash video game

Other uses
Dark Angel (horse), an Irish-bred, British-trained Thoroughbred
Dark Angel (wrestler) or Sarah Stock, Canadian professional wrestler
Detroit Dark Angels, women's semi-professional American football team
Angel Gabriele or Dark Angel (1956–2016), American comic book creator and professional wrestling manager
Dark Angel, a rock column in Arches National Park, Utah, U.S.

See also
Angel of Darkness (disambiguation)
Dark Angael, a 1997 video game
Evil Angel (disambiguation)
Fallen angel (disambiguation)